Wesley Whitehouse defeated Daniel Elsner in the final, 6–3, 7–6(8–6) to win the boys' singles tennis title at the 1997 Wimbledon Championships.

Seeds

  Daniel Elsner (final)
  Luis Horna (third round)
  Nicolás Massú (second round)
  Kobi Ziv (third round)
  Wesley Whitehouse (champion)
  Julien Jeanpierre (quarterfinals)
  Fernando González (third round)
  Paradorn Srichaphan (first round)
  Jean-René Lisnard (semifinals)
  Xavier Malisse (quarterfinals)
  Robin Vik (second round)
  Miha Gregorc (quarterfinals)
  Olivier Rochus (semifinals)
  Brian Vahaly (quarterfinals)
  Cheng Wei-jen  (second round)
  Olivier Levant (first round)

Draw

Finals

Top half

Section 1

Section 2

Bottom half

Section 3

Section 4

References

External links

Boys' Singles
Wimbledon Championship by year – Boys' singles